Laurent de Gourcuff (born 1976 or 1977) is a French businessman, the founder of the hospitality company Paris Society.

Early life and education
The de Gourcuffs are a Breton noble family, originally from Plovan.  Laurent de Gourcuff was born in Neuilly-sur-Seine; his parents ran restaurants and organised events. After hosting paying parties as a 16-year-old and admitting to cheating on his baccalauréat, he graduated from the European Business School Paris.

Career

His early career was as an owner of nightlife establishments. He started his first company, Octopussy, when he was 21, and bought his first club, Les Planches, when he was 22. In 2008, he founded Groupe Noctis, which he expanded to include several restaurants and nightclubs in Paris, many in association with Gilles Malafosse. His first restaurant was Monsieur Bleu, in the Palais de Tokyo, opened with Malafosse in 2013. He was one of a new generation of nightculb and restaurant entrepreneurs in Paris that also included  and Jean-Philippe Cartier. Despite having to sell several properties in the mid-2000s to pay €3 million in personal debts from a bad investment, he re-established his company holdings and diversified into event spaces and hosting. 

, Noctis also had establishments in La Baule-Escoublac and Marseille and on Île de Ré. In July 2017, Accor acquired a 31% share in the company; in 2021 this was increased to 40.8%. Noctis was subsequently renamed to Paris Society and became known for "eatertainment". It has also expanded outside France, including Raspoutine in Miami (a branch of the Paris cabaret restaurant ), Gigi in Dubai, and properties in Los Angeles and London. Many of de Gourcuff's restaurants offer views from elevated vantage points. In 2019, he transformed the former L'Opéra restaurant at the Palais Garnier opera house into CoCo, a branch of which is scheduled to open in 2023 at the former Les Brotteaux station in Lyon. In 2021, Paris Society partnered with the new owner to transform the 17th-century  at Belle Île into a luxury hotel. A five-restaurant luxury hotel at the former Cistercian Vaux-de-Cernay Abbey is scheduled to open in 2023.

By 2017, de Gourcuff's rivalry with Patou, chairman of Moma Group, had become contentious; the two agreed in 2019 to end the conflict. Beginning in February 2021, de Gourcuff and others were investigated in connection with the granting of a restaurant licence at Longchamp Racecourse; he was reportedly called in for further questioning in early December 2022. In November 2022, Accor announced its purchase of the outstanding stock in Paris Society, whose estimated revenue for that year was €250 million, with de Gourcuff to remain at its head.

Personal life
De Gourcuff and his wife, Constance, have three children He has a second residence in Eure. He is teetotal.

References 

1970s births
Living people
Year of birth uncertain
21st-century French businesspeople

European Business School Paris alumni